Rajang may refer to:
 Rajang River, a river in Sarawak, Malaysia
 Rajang (federal constituency), former constituency in Sarawak, Malaysia
 Rajang, Iran, a village in eastern Iran

See also
 
 Hulu Rajang
 Kuala Rajang (disambiguation)
 Rejang (disambiguation)